Overdrive is a 1993 video game from Team17. The game was released for MS-DOS in April 1994.

Reception

Amiga Action gave the game a score of 83% stating" Overdrive is an outstanding racing game. Fast action, variation are the key ingredients for a game of this type and Overdrive is literally flowing with them.

References

1993 video games